The 1991 Central American and Caribbean Championships in Athletics were held at the Estadio Heriberto Jara Corona in Xalapa, Veracruz, Mexico between 26–28 July.

Medal summary

Men's events

Women's events

A = affected by altitude

Medal table

See also
1991 in athletics (track and field)

External links
Men Results – GBR Athletics
Women Results – GBR Athletics

Central American and Caribbean Championships in Athletics
Central American and Caribbean Championships
A
A
International athletics competitions hosted by Mexico